Mihai Bagiu (born April 10, 1971) is an American gymnast. He competed in six events at the 1996 Summer Olympics.

References

1971 births
Living people
American male artistic gymnasts
Olympic gymnasts of the United States
Gymnasts at the 1996 Summer Olympics
Sportspeople from Timișoara
Pan American Games medalists in gymnastics
Pan American Games gold medalists for the United States
Pan American Games silver medalists for the United States
Gymnasts at the 1995 Pan American Games
Medalists at the 1995 Pan American Games